Elliot Scott (19 July 1915 – 29 October 1993) was an English art director. He was nominated for three Academy Awards in the category Best Art Direction.

Selected filmography
Scott was nominated for three Academy Awards for Best Art Direction:
 The Americanization of Emily (1964)
 The Incredible Sarah (1976)
 Who Framed Roger Rabbit (1988)

Other films:
 The Haunting (1963)
 The Watcher in the Woods (1980)
 Indiana Jones and the Temple of Doom (1984)
 Labyrinth (1986)
 The Pirates of Penzance (1983)

References

External links

1915 births
1993 deaths
British film designers
English art directors
British production designers